Diego Torres may refer to:

Diego de Torres y Moyachoque (1549–1590), mestizo cacique
Diego de Torres Bello (1551-1638), Spanish Jesuit
Diego Torres Altamirano (1557–1621), Spanish bishop
Diego de Torres Vargas (1590–1649), Spanish priest
Diego de Torres Villarroel (1693–1770), Spanish writer and scholar
Diego Torres (singer) (born 1971), Argentine musician and actor
Diego Torres (album), 1992
Diego Torres (footballer, born 1978), Spanish footballer
Diego Torres (footballer, born 1979), Mexican footballer
Diego Torres (footballer, born 1982), Argentine footballer
Diego Torres (footballer, born 1990), Argentine footballer
Diego Torres (footballer, born 1992), Chilean footballer
Diego Torres (footballer, born 2002), Paraguayan footballer

See also
Diego Torre (tenor) (born 1979), Mexican opera singer
Diego de la Torre (born 1984), Mexican footballer
Diego Jiménez Torres Airport